QBD Books, originally Queensland Book Depot and formerly "QBD" The Bookshop!, is a large chain of bookshops in Australia, with the majority of stores found in the states of Queensland and New South Wales. The business started in the late 1890s as a means for the Uniting Church to sell religious texts. However over the years the consumer market changed and the business was sold to the Robinson family in 1991.

QBD has since grown into one of the largest bookstore chains in Australia, with approximately 68 stores operating across the country.  While stores stock a wide range of titles, QBD specialises in discount books.

References

Bookshops of Australia